NA-192 Shikarpur-I is a constituency for the National Assembly of Pakistan.

Members of Parliament

2018-2022: NA-198 Shikarpur-I

Election 2002 

General elections were held on 10 Oct 2002. Muhammad Ibrahim Jatoi of National Alliance won by 53,235 votes. The case was taken to the supreme court by Aftab Shahban Mirani where he won the case and regained the seat.

Election 2008 

General elections were held on 18 Feb 2008. Aftab Shabaan Meerani of PPP won by 47,379 votes.

Election 2013 

General elections were held on 11 May 2013. Mr. Aftab Shahban Mirani of PPP won by 53,165 votes and became the  member of National Assembly.

Election 2018 

General elections were held on 25 July 2018.

See also
NA-191 Kashmore
NA-193 Shikarpur-II

References

External links 
Election result's official website

NA-202